The Blaster Learning System is an educational video game series originally created and published by Davidson & Associates, but is now owned and published by Knowledge Adventure, after the two companies were acquired and merged by CUC Software. Titles in the series have been produced for several computer systems, video game consoles, and as standalone handheld units. Originally, the series simply learned mathematics, but eventually expanded to other subjects, such as language arts (reading) and science. Because the first Math Blaster series was so popular, Davidson made Reading Blaster in 1994, which also went on to be a hit.

Science Blaster was introduced in 1996, but never reach the same popularity as its predecessors.

History 
The first reboot of the Davidson fundamentals line came in 1989. The original Math Blaster was written in Applesoft Basic and the Microsoft equivalent. Under the direction of Mike Albanese, the Davidson programming team used Fig Forth to make a cross-platform development system. The product did well, and it was the first of many Forth-based products that Davidson would make.

After starting off with a huge boom and providing the base for the establishment of a very successful public corporation, the Blaster series eventually fell victim to marketing cuts. In an attempt to sell both up and down the age group added more, Blasters were designed with increasingly thin, fuzzy and overlapping target age groups. Finally, the line came under fierce attack from the Gross brothers of Knowledge Adventure, led by Barton Listic. Knowledge Adventure countered with a simple grade-based sub-division with their JumpStart logo. Eventually, Knowledge Adventure and Davidson were acquired by CUC International to form CUC Software, and the company lines were merged.

In the year of 1999, coinciding with the CBS' Saturday morning cartoon Blaster's Universe animated by the Canadian studio Nelvana, the characters were once again changed, probably to be more identifiable as people, with Blasternaut becoming Max Blaster, a 12-year-old boy obsessed with science and space in the 21st century, and his assistant Galactic Commander (short for G.C.), a cool 12-year-old girl who looks like an earthling but is really an alien. Together, they have to work in secret to save G.C.'s universe by outsmarting the intergalactic bandits with logic and creativity. Spot, the robot companion was removed and replaced with a robot dog named "MEL" ("Mechanically Enhanced Lapdog").

In the late 1990s and early 2000s, when Davidson started being bought out and merged with other companies, these titles were renamed and repackaged, but the content didn't change. One example is the latest release of Math Blaster for 3rd Grade in which the box art features the brand's all-new CBS cartoon characters, while the screen grabs of the game unveils a very different Blaster character and style; "Powerful Praise" quoted on the box gave 4½ stars for the game while admitting it was "previously published as "Math Blaster Ages 6–9", but ironically that was itself previously published as "Mega Math Blaster".

Design

The Blaster series

Math

Reading

Other subjects

Compilations

Other languages
Math:
 Swedish (titled "Matte Raketen")
 Finnish (titled "Matikkaraketti")
 Japanese (titled "算数戦士ブラスター(Sansū Senshi Burasutā)")

Reception

II Computing listed Math Blaster second on the magazine's list of top Apple II education software as of late 1985, based on sales and market-share data.

References

External links
 Math Blaster website

Children's educational video games
Video games developed in the United States